"If You Let Me Stay" is the debut single by American singer Terence Trent D'Arby in 1987. It was taken from his debut album, Introducing the Hardline According to Terence Trent D'Arby.

Reception

It reached #68 on the Billboard Hot 100 and peaked at #7 on the UK Singles Chart.

It was not until the release of the second single, "Wishing Well", that D'Arby managed to crossover his success in the UK to the US.
That song became one of the biggest hits of 1987 in the United States.

Charts

Weekly charts

Year-end charts

References

1987 debut singles
Terence Trent D'Arby songs
Songs written by Terence Trent D'Arby
1987 songs
Columbia Records singles